Buratti is an Italian surname. Notable people with the surname include:

Bonnie Buratti, American astronomer
Domenico Buratti (1881–1960), Italian painter, poet and illustrator
Franciscus Buratti (born 1582), Bishop of Vulturara e Montecorvino
Girolamo Buratti (active 1580), Italian Renaissance painter
Robert Buratti (born 1977), Australian painter, author

Italian-language surnames